Ciprian Sergiu Teleman (born 27 January 1969) is a Romanian politician who has been serving as Minister of Research, Innovation and Digitalization in the Cîțu Cabinet, led by Prime Minister Florin Cîțu, .

References 

Living people
1969 births
Place of birth missing (living people)
21st-century Romanian politicians
Members of the Romanian Cabinet
Freedom, Unity and Solidarity Party politicians